Vietnam competed in the 2022 World Games in Birmingham, United States, from 7 to 17 July 2022. The games were originally scheduled for July 2021, but were postponed due to the rescheduling of the Tokyo 2020 Olympic Games. Athletes representing Vietnam won two gold medals and the country finished in 31st place in the medal table.

Competitors
The following is the list of number of competitors in the Games.

Billiards sports

Vietnam qualified one athlete to compete at the games.

Muay Thai

Vietnam entered two athletes into the muaythai competition at the World Games.

Wushu 
Vietnam qualified three athletes into this tournament. 2019 world championship silver and bronze medalist Dương Thúy Vi and Hoàng Thị Phương Giang will competed with Phạm Quốc Khánh, the 2019 Southeast Asian Games gold medalist.

See also
2022 World Games

References

Nations at the 2022 World Games
World Games
Vietnam at multi-sport events